NGC 1788 is a reflection nebula in the constellation of Orion.  It is rather sharply defined on its southwest perimeter where it is flanked by the dark nebula known as Lynds 1616. Lynds 1616 is apparently part of NGC 1788.  The brightest involved star is 10th magnitude and lies in the northwest sector.

Gallery

References

External links

 
 http://atlas.zevallos.com.br

Orion molecular cloud complex
1788
Orion (constellation)
Reflection nebulae